Alto Miramar is a subdivision of the city of Mindelo in the island of São Vicente, Cape Verde. Its population was 524 at the 2010 census. It is situated directly northeast of the city centre. The main streets of the neighbourhood are Rua Unidade Africana and Rua da Paz.

References

External links

Mindelo